Derbyshire County Cricket Club in 1954 was the cricket season when the English club Derbyshire had been playing for eighty-four years. It was their fiftieth season in the County Championship and they won eleven matches in the County Championship to finish in third place.

1954 season

Derbyshire played 28 games in the County Championship, one match against Scotland, and one against the touring Pakistanis. In a successful season, they won twelve first class matches altogether.  Guy Willatt was in his fourth season as captain. Arnold Hamer was top scorer and Cliff Gladwin took most wickets.

Two players made their debut in the season. Gerald Wyatt played one game and then appeared intermittently over the next few years. Charles Lee went on to score over 12,000 runs and became captain ten years later.

Matches

{| class="wikitable" width="100%"
! bgcolor="#efefef" colspan=6 | List of matches
|- bgcolor="#efefef"
!No.
!Date
!V
!Result 
!Margin
!Notes
 |- 
|1
|8 May 1954
| Leicestershire County Ground, Derby 
|bgcolor="#00FF00"|Won 
| 7 wickets
|    Tompkin 112; Spencer 6-64; HL Jackson 6-43 
|- 
|2
|12 May 1954
| Kent  Bat and Ball Ground, Gravesend 
|bgcolor="#00FF00"|Won 
| 81 runs
|    Wright 7/62; GL Willatt 103; Evans 109; E Smith 6-60; C Gladwin 5-22
|- 
|3
|15 May 1954
| Essex   Chalkwell Park, Westcliff-on-Sea  
|bgcolor="#00FF00"|Won 
| 5 wickets
|    Horsfall 117; A Hamer 104; C Gladwin 5-79 
|- 
|4
|19 May 1954
| Hampshire County Ground, Southampton 
|bgcolor="#FF0000"|Lost 
| 4 wickets
|    Dare 5-49; E Smith 5-44 
|- 
|5
|22 May 1954
| Essex   Queen's Park, Chesterfield 
|bgcolor="#FF0000"|Lost 
| 6 wickets
|    C Gladwin 8-50 
|- 
|6
|29 May 1954
| Lancashire  Old Trafford, Manchester 
 |bgcolor="#FFCC00"|Drawn
| 
|    Hilton 7-51 
|- 
|7
|2 Jun 1954
| Scotland  Park Road Ground, Buxton  
|bgcolor="#00FF00"|Won 
| 5 wickets
|    Cosh 99; Youngson 6-84; 
|- 
|8
|5 Jun 1954
| Warwickshire  County Ground, Derby 
 |bgcolor="#FFCC00"|Drawn
| 
|    Bannister 5-99  
|- 
|9
|12 Jun 1954
| Yorkshire Queen's Park, Chesterfield 
 |bgcolor="#FFCC00"|Drawn
| 
|    Lester 121; Appleyard 6-71; E Smith 5-37 
|- 
|10
|16 Jun 1954
|  Surrey County Ground, Derby 
|bgcolor="#FF0000"|Lost 
| 10 wickets
|    C Gladwin 6-75; Bedser 5-22 
|- 
|11
|19 Jun 1954
| Glamorgan   Cardiff Arms Park 
|bgcolor="#00FF00"|Won 
| 5 runs
|    Hedges 103; Jones 104; Shepherd 5-45; HL Jackson 6-24; C Gladwin 8-114
|- 
|12
|26 Jun 1954
| Lancashire  Park Road Ground, Buxton 
|bgcolor="#00FF00"|Won 
| 169 runs
|    HL Jackson 6-33 
|- 
|13
|30 Jun 1954
| Kent Queen's Park, Chesterfield 
|bgcolor="#00FF00"|Won 
| 7 wickets
|    HL Jackson 6-40 
|- 
|14
|3 Jul 1954
|  Sussex   Cricket Field Road Ground, Horsham 
|bgcolor="#00FF00"|Won 
| 76 runs
|    James 5-31; HL Jackson 5-30 
|- 
|15
|7 Jul 1954
| Pakistan  County Ground, Derby  
 |bgcolor="#FFCC00"|Drawn
| 
|    AC Revill 101; Ahmed 5-53; DC Morgan 5-57 
|- 
|16
|10 Jul 1954
| Somerset Johnson Park, Yeovil 
|bgcolor="#00FF00"|Won 
| 10 wickets
|    Tremlett 5-31; HL Jackson 5-17 
|- 
|17
|14 Jul 1954
| Hampshire Ind Coope Ground, Burton-on-Trent 
 |bgcolor="#FFCC00"|Drawn
| 
|    Harrison 114; JM Kelly 116; GO Dawkes 143; HL Jackson 7-64; Cannings 7-132 
|- 
|18
|17 Jul 1954
|  WorcestershireCounty Ground, New Road, Worcester 
|bgcolor="#FF0000"|Lost 
| 4 wickets
|     
|- 
|19
|21 Jul 1954
|  Sussex   County Ground, Derby 
 |bgcolor="#FFCC00"|Drawn
| 
|    A Hamer 118; GL Willatt 101 
|- 
|20
|24 Jul 1954
| Nottinghamshire  Rutland Recreation Ground, Ilkeston 
 |bgcolor="#FFCC00"|Drawn
| 
|    C Gladwin 6-114 
|- 
|21
|28 Jul 1954
| Yorkshire Headingley, Leeds 
|bgcolor="#00FF00"|Won 
| 6 wickets
|    A Hamer 147; Trueman 6-109; DC Morgan 5-23 and 5-55 
|- 
|22
|31 Jul 1954
| Warwickshire Edgbaston, Birmingham 
 |bgcolor="#FFCC00"|Drawn
| 
|    HL Jackson 5-28 
|- 
|23
|4 Aug 1954
|  Gloucestershire  Queen's Park, Chesterfield 
|bgcolor="#FF0000"|Lost 
| 60 runs
|    Graveney 222; McHugh 5-82; E Smith 5-42 
|- 
|24
|7 Aug 1954
| Northamptonshire Wellingborough School Ground 
 |bgcolor="#FFCC00"|Drawn
| 
|     
|- 
|25
|11 Aug 1954
|  Gloucestershire  College Ground, Cheltenham 
|bgcolor="#00FF00"|Won 
| Innings and 52 runs
|   C Gladwin 5-24 
|- 
|26
|14 Aug 1954
|  Worcestershire County Ground, Derby 
|bgcolor="#00FF00"|Won 
| 9 wickets
|    Flavell 5-53 
|- 
|27
|18 Aug 1954
| Middlesex    Queen's Park, Chesterfield 
 |bgcolor="#FFCC00"|Drawn
| 
|     
|- 
|28
|21 Aug 1954
| Nottinghamshire  Trent Bridge, Nottingham 
 |bgcolor="#FFCC00"|Drawn
| 
|     
|- 
|29
|25 Aug 1954
| Leicestershire Grace Road, Leicester 
 |bgcolor="#FFCC00"|Drawn
| 
|    Walsh 5-65 
|- 
|30
|28 Aug 1954
| Glamorgan   Queen's Park, Chesterfield 
|bgcolor="#FF0000"|Lost 
| 10 wickets
|    Wooller 5-45; Watkins 7-28 
|- 
|

Statistics

County Championship batting averages

County Championship bowling averages

Wicket Keepers
George Dawkes 	Catches 51, Stumping 9

See also
Derbyshire County Cricket Club seasons
1954 English cricket season

References

1954 in English cricket
Derbyshire County Cricket Club seasons